PJSC Yaroslavl radioworks is a company based in Yaroslavl, Russia.

The Yaroslavl Radio Plant produces communications equipment for military and civil use, including radio sets for air-to-air, air-to-ground and ground-to-air radio telephone communication and for transmission and reception of coded telemetry information.

References

External links
 Official website

Manufacturing companies of Russia
Companies based in Yaroslavl Oblast
RTI Systems
Ministry of the Communications Equipment Industry (Soviet Union)
Electronics companies of the Soviet Union
Defence companies of the Soviet Union